Bigg Boss 5 is the season of the Telugu version of the Indian reality television series Bigg Boss based on the Dutch series BSelmon Brother. The show premiered on 5 September 2021 on Star Maa and Disney+ Hotstar with Akkineni Nagarjuna returning as a host for third time.

The season's finale took place on 19 December 2021 with Sunny winning the title along with 50 lakh in prize money, a bike, and a plot worth 25 lakh while Shanmukh Jaswanth emerged as the first runner-up.

Production
This season was scheduled to launch in June 2021, but was delayed due to the second wave of the COVID-19 pandemic in India. The show organizers officially released a teaser using the show's logo on 1 August 2021. The promo shoots of the show were directed by Prasanth Varma. On 26 August 2021, it was confirmed that the show would premiere on 5 September 2021 on Star Maa.

Bigg Boss 5 Buzzz
Bigg Boss 5 Buzzz is an Indian Telugu-language television talk show about the reality television series Bigg Boss Telugu. Hosted by Ariyana Glory, the show features failed contestants from Bigg Boss 5 as guests. The show premiered on 13 September 2021 on Star Maa Music. Unaired portions of the show were also added to Disney+ Hotstar and Star Maa Music releases.

Housemates 
The participants in the order of appearance:
Siri Hanmanth – Television actress and YouTuber. She has appeared in TV serials like Evare Nuvvu Mohini, Agnisakshi and Savitramma Gari Abbayi.
Sunny – Video jockey and television actor. He is best known for his role in Kalyana Vaibhogam.
Lahari Shari – Film actress known for the movies Arjun Reddy and Zombie Reddy.
Sreerama Chandra – Playback singer, musician, and film actor. He was the winner of Indian Idol.
Anee (Anita Lama) – Dance choreographer and television judge. She is known for her work on Mahanati and has been a judge of various reality dance shows, including Dhee and Dancee Plus.
Lobo (Mohammad Khayyum) – Former video jockey on Maa Music and film actor.
Shailaja Priya  –  Film and television actress. She is part of the soap operas Kotha Bangaaram,No.1 Kodalu, Sasirekha Parinayam and Priya Sakhi.
Jaswanth "Jessie" Padala – Model and television actor. He appeared in the soap opera Saptha Mathrika and the film Entha Manchivaadavuraa.
Priyanka Singh– Television personality. She is part of the television comedy show Jabardasth and is the second transgender contestant in the show.
Shanmukh Jaswanth – YouTuber. He is best known for his role of Shannu in the short video The Viva and the web-series The Software DevLOVEper and appeared in the 2019 film Nannu Dochukunduvate
Hamida Khatoon – Film actress. She is known for the film Sahasam Cheyara Dimbaka.
Nataraj – Dance choreographer and television judge. He was part of the reality dance show Aata.
Sarayu Roy – YouTuber. She is a part of 7 Arts YouTube channel.
Vishwa – Film and television actor. He appeared in the TV series Yuva, Ganga Tho Rambabu and Ganga and Manga.
Umadevi Maria – Film and television actress. She is best known for her role Bhagyalakshmi in the television series Karthika Deepam.
Maanas Nagulapalli – Film and television actor. He is part of the television series Kokilamma and Manasichi Choodu.
Kajal – Voice actor and radio personality from Radio Mirchi.
Swetha Varma – Film actress, known for films such as Pachchis, Mithai and Raani.
Ravi Kiran – Television presenter, radio personality and film actor.

Reception 
The launch of the fifth season has received about 15.7 TVR in general and 18 TVR with HD viewership. The grand finale episode had secured 18.4 TVR + millions of views on Disney Hotstar.

References 

2021 Indian television seasons
04